World Series of Fighting 28: Moraes vs. Barajas was a mixed martial arts event held on  at the Next Level Sports Complex in Garden Grove, California.

Background
The event was headlined by a WSOF Bantamweight Championship fight between champion Marlon Moraes and Joseph Barajas, and also featured two BAMMA USA bouts, including a Lightweight Championship fight between Chris Saunders and Darren Smith.

Results

See also
List of WSOF events
List of WSOF champions

References

World Series of Fighting events
2016 in mixed martial arts